Evgeni Sviridov (born 15 August 1974 in Tashkent) is a retired pairs figure skater from Uzbekistan. With partner Natalia Ponomareva, he placed 18th at the 2002 Winter Olympics.

Results

With Ponomareva

Earlier partnerships 
(with Djo)

(with Karabaeva)

External links
 

Uzbekistani male pair skaters
Olympic figure skaters of Uzbekistan
Figure skaters at the 2002 Winter Olympics
1974 births
Sportspeople from Tashkent
Living people
Asian Games medalists in figure skating
Figure skaters at the 1999 Asian Winter Games

Asian Games bronze medalists for Uzbekistan
Medalists at the 1999 Asian Winter Games
20th-century Uzbekistani people
21st-century Uzbekistani people